PMU may refer to:

Paracelsus Private Medical University of Salzburg
Periyar Maniammai University, in Tamil Nadu, India, now Periyar Maniammai Institute of Science & Technology
Permanent makeup
Phasor measurement unit, a measurement device in power systems to estimate magnitude and phase angle of time-varying electric signals
Police MRT Unit, Singapore Police Force
Pomeranian Medical University
Popular Mobilization Forces or Popular Mobilization Units, Iraqi state-sponsored umbrella organization of Shia-dominated militias
Power Management Unit, an integrated circuit on some computers that controls power-related features
Pump Me Up, type of kite used in kiteboarding/kitesurfing
Pregnant mare urine
Presbyterian Missionary Union
Prince Mohammad bin Fahd University
Progressive Muslim Union